Sealed Air Corporation is a packaging company known for its brands: Cryovac food packaging and Bubble Wrap cushioning packaging. It sold off its stake in Diversey Holdings in 2017. Headquartered in Charlotte, North Carolina, United States, its current CEO is Ted Doheny.

History
In 1957, American engineer Alfred W. Fielding and Swiss inventor Marc Chavannes attempted to invent plastic wallpaper with a paper backing. While the wallpaper failed, Fielding and Chavannes later realized that what they had come up with could be used for packing material. Sealed Air was founded in 1960 based on this invention of Bubble Wrap. The same year, Sealed Air raised $85,000 in its initial public offering. Fielding served as executive vice president and director of Sealed Air until his retirement in 1987, while Chavannes worked mostly as a consultant.

Shortly after a 1998 business restructuring of the global conglomerate W.R. Grace Company-Conn, the original Sealed Air was merged into Grace subsidiary W. R. Grace & Co. NY, and the surviving company was named W. R. Grace & Co.  Shortly thereafter, this W.R. Grace & Co renamed itself Sealed Air, the name of the current entity, but now a vastly larger corporation due to the Grace components.  Years later, in 2002, this Sealed Air Corporation was required to pay to W. R. Grace Company-Conn $728 million to settle bankruptcy and fraud allegations brought against the original merger.  T.J. Dermot Dunphy served as CEO from 1971 to 2000. An Oxford University graduate who received his MBA from Harvard Business School, he became chairman of Kildare Enterprises, LLC in November 2000 after leaving Sealed Air. During his tenure at Sealed Air, sales grew from $5 million to $3 billion.

William Hickey served as CEO from the year 2000 to March 2013. He previously served in several capacities at Sealed Air, including COO, executive vice president, CFO, vice president, and general manager of the Food Packaging Division and the Cellu Products Division. Before working for Sealed Air, he was CPA at Arthur Young and CFO of W. R. Grace and Company's Latin American operations.

Sealed Air produced the foam that was ignited in the 2003 the Station nightclub fire and has paid $25 million to victims in various civil settlements.

In March 2013, Jérôme Péribère took over as CEO and president of Sealed Air. He obtained his business economics and finance degree from Sciences Po in Paris, France. He previously served as president and COO of Sealed Air before taking over as CEO, and prior to joining Sealed Air, he worked in several managerial roles with the Dow Chemical Company from 1977 to 2012.

On July 23, 2014, Sealed Air announced that it would be moving its global headquarters to Charlotte, North Carolina. In January 2018, Ted Doheny took over as CEO.

Acquisitions 
In 1970, Sealed Air acquired Smith Packaging Ltd., which was later renamed Sealed Air of Canada, Ltd., marking Sealed Air's first international move. In 1971, Sealed Air began marketing a new product; by laminating the AirCap cushioning to paper, the company now had Mail Lite padded shipping envelopes.

In 1973, Sealed Air began marketing Ply-Mask, a pressure-sensitive polyethylene film used to protect delicate surfaces from scratches and the company's first product not based on its bubble technology. The same year, Sealed Air brought their market to Europe by acquiring 10 percent of Sibco Universal, S.A., a French manufacturing firm. Over the next few years, Sealed Air bought out the rest of Sibco and came up with the Sealed Air Solar Blanket.

Acquired in 1977, Instapak foam is an expanding polyurethane foam that comes in a variety of densities. Used primarily for shipping, the foam-in-bag process molds to the shape of the object and expands to fill the void space of its shipping container.

Sealed Air acquired Cellu Products Co. and Dri-Loc in 1983, Jiffy in 1987, Sentinel in 1991, Trigon Packaging NZ in 1993, and the Shurtuff Division of Shuford Mills, Inc. in 1993. In 1994, Sealed Air followed up with the further acquisitions of Hereford Paper and Allied Products Ltd., Sup-Air-Pack, Fill Air, and packaging companies based in Norway, France, and Italy.

In 1998, Sealed Air was acquired and merged with the Cryovac Division of  W.R. Grace for a $4.9 billion stock trade, and spun off from the Grace parent holding company as  W. R. Grace, Inc.  That corporation changed its name to the current Sealed Air. In June 2000, Sealed Air purchased Dolphin Packaging for $119 million, to better serve its European customers. In October 2011, Sealed Air acquired Diversey Holdings, until its acquisition by Bain Capital in September 2017.

In October 2017, Sealed Air acquired Fagerdala Singapore Pte Ltd., a manufacturer and fabricator of polyethylene foam.

Operations
Sealed Air's food care division makes packaging for the food and beverage industry, while its product care division produces protective and specialty packaging materials for a wide range of goods.

Brands

Bubble Wrap
Initially created as a failed wallpaper, Bubble was subsequently used as a greenhouse insulator. Finally, it took on its best-known use as a packaging material. In its earliest form, Bubble Wrap suffered from leaky bubbles, but by the mid 1960s a special coating was developed to prevent the bubbles from losing air. In 1969, Sealed Air reported $4 million in sales, mostly attributed to Bubble Wrap, as it was still a proprietary product at that time.

Cryovac
Cryovac is a thin plastic, used to shrink or wrap objects. Depending on the type of job required of it, the plastic comes in a variety of thickness and durability.

One of the uses of Cryovac is to wrap food. Once wrapped, most of the air in the package is removed to prevent oxidation and inhibit the growth of most pathogens. This process also gives food a longer shelf life in the refrigerator or freezer and makes freezer burn nearly impossible. Cryovac Inc., a South Carolina-based company, created this product in the 1950 to extend the shipping distance of freshly slaughtered turkeys for Thanksgiving and Christmas.

References

11. Bloomberg News, as recorded in Baltimore Sun https://www.baltimoresun.com/news/bs-xpm-2002-11-30-0211300143-story.html

External links 

Companies listed on the New York Stock Exchange
Packaging companies of the United States
Manufacturing companies established in 1960
American companies established in 1960
1960 establishments in New Jersey
Manufacturing companies based in North Carolina
Companies based in Charlotte, North Carolina
1960s initial public offerings